Mojibur Rahman is a Bangladesh Nationalist Party politician and the former Member of Parliament of Mymensingh-24.

Career
Rahman was elected to parliament from Mymensingh-24 as a Bangladesh Nationalist Party candidate in 1979.

References

Bangladesh Nationalist Party politicians
Living people
2nd Jatiya Sangsad members
Year of birth missing (living people)